Poncitlán  is a town and municipality, in Jalisco in central-western Mexico. The municipality covers an area of 672.31 km2.

As of 2005, the municipality had a total population of 43,817.

Place Names
Poncitlán means "place of cilacayotes", "next to the shore chilares" or "place of God Ponze." It is located west of the Ocotlán municipality.

Sister cities
 Palmdale, California, United States (1998)

References

Municipalities of Jalisco